Ingela Birgitta "Pling" Forsman (born 26 August 1950 in , Sweden) is a Swedish lyricist in popular music. As a student Forsman attended the Adolf Fredrik's Music School in Stockholm. 1981–2009, 33 of her songs have competed in the Swedish Melodifestivalen, three of them winners: Bra vibrationer (1985), Se på mej (1995) and Kärleken är (1998). She has also written the text to psalm number 862 in the Swedish hymn book, Blomningstid, and two children's books.

Her older sister first called her 'Pling', and she is now commonly referred to as 'Pling Forsman'.

Her first public performance was on the Swedish children's radio show Barnens Brevlåda in 1954.

Songs in Melodifestivalen written by Ingela Forsman
1981 - Men natten är vår - placed 5th
1983 - Bara en enda gång - placed 5th
1984
Kall som is - placed 4th
Tjuvarnas natt - shared 5th place
1985
Bra vibrationer - winner for Kikki Danielsson
1 + 1 = 2 - eliminated in first voting round
Jag vet hur det känns - placed 5th
1986 - ABCD - eliminated
1987
När morgonstjärnan brinner - placed 3rd
Det finns en morgondag - eliminated
1988
Nästa weekend - eliminated
Om igen - placed 2nd
1989
Du (öppnar min värld) - placed 4th
Nattens drottning - shared 5th place
1993 - Närmare dig - unplaced
1995 - Se på mej - winner
1998 - Kärleken är - winner
2000 - När jag tänker på imorgon - shared 2nd place
2001 - Ingemansland - placed 4th
2004
Min kärlek - placed 2nd
Efharisto - eliminated in second chance round
2005 - Håll om mig - placed 2nd
2006
Etymon - eliminated in semifinal
En droppe regn - eliminated in the second chance round
Jag ljuger så bra - placed 7th
2007 - Jag måste kyssa dig - eliminated in the second chance round
2008:
I Love Europe - placed 9th
Den första svalan - eliminated in the semifinals
Jag saknar dig ibland - eliminated in the semifinals
2009:
Så vill stjärnorna - finalist
Med hjärtat fyllt av ljus - eliminated in the semifinals
Jag tror på oss - eliminated in the semifinals
Du är älskad där du går - eliminated in the semifinals
2013
Make me no 1 - eliminated in the semifinals
2014
Casanova - eliminated in the semifinals
2021
Den du är - eliminated in the semifinals

1950 births
Living people
Musicians from Stockholm
Swedish songwriters
Swedish women composers